Flying Doctors of Nigeria is an air ambulance service established by Dr Ola Orekunrin.

Description
It has its main office in Lagos and another in Port Harcourt with 20 aircraft and 47 staff, 44 of whom are doctors. As well as moving injured and ill patients to the hospital, the organisation has set up medical infrastructure for the government and worked with private companies to improve their on-site medical services.  

It contracts with the government and private companies. Helicopters are provided for corporate clients running large events, and wealthy families and individuals can set up a membership plan for private emergency healthcare.

The company has entered into an agreement with a UK-based call centre to operate telephone services to provide stable communications.

References

External links
 Flying Doctors Nigeria Limited

Air ambulance services in Nigeria
Healthcare in Nigeria
Health care companies of Nigeria
Companies based in Lagos
Nigeria
Non-profit organizations based in Lagos
Healthcare in Lagos